William Dennis Hawkland (November 25, 1920 – November 7, 2004) was Chancellor of Louisiana State University from 1979 to 1989.   Hawkland was also the holder of a Boyd Professorship at LSU.

A noted scholar of commercial transaction law and banking law, Hawkland graduated from the University of Minnesota Law School in 1947, and subsequently received an honorary Doctor of Laws degree from the University of Minnesota in 2005.   He additionally taught law at the University of Illinois, Urbana-Champaign, and was given the Homer Kripke Achievement Award by the American College of Commercial Finance Lawyers in 1997.  He   served as Dean of the SUNY Buffalo law school and taught law at Rutgers University, Temple University, and UCLA as well.

Personal life

He resided in Baton Rouge, Louisiana and was married to Rosemary Neal Hawkland.

References 

American legal scholars
Leaders of Louisiana State University
People from Baton Rouge, Louisiana
University of Minnesota Law School alumni
University of Illinois Urbana-Champaign faculty
Louisiana lawyers
1920 births
2004 deaths
20th-century American lawyers
20th-century American academics